Hengky Ardiles (born May 20, 1981 in Padang Panjang, West Sumatra) is a former Indonesian professional footballer who played as a right back and is currently the head coach of PS Muaro Jambi.

International career
He made his international debut against Bahrain on February 29, 2012.

Honours

Club
Semen Padang
 Indonesia Premier League (1): 2011-12
 Indonesian Community Shield (1): 2013
 Liga 2 Runner-up: 2018

Individual
Indonesia Premier League Best Player (1): 2011-12

References

1980 births
Indonesian footballers
Living people
Minangkabau people
Semen Padang F.C. players
Persikabo Bogor players
Indonesia international footballers
People from Padang Panjang
Liga 1 (Indonesia) players
Indonesian Premier League players
Association football defenders
Sportspeople from West Sumatra